This is a list of Malawian writers.

 Tito Banda (1950–2014), novelist, academic
 Ezra Jofiya Chadza (1923–1985), poet and novelist

 William Chafulumira (1908–1981), writer on social issues
 Yesaya Chibambo, author of A Short History of the Ngoni (1933), translated into English by Rev. Charles Stuart.
 Shadreck Chikoti (b. 1979), writer and social activist
 Kelvin Sulugwe (b. 1990) entrepreneur, diplomat; author of In Honest Ways.    
 Steve Chimombo (1945–2015), writer, poet, editor and teacher
 Frank Chipasula (b. 1949), poet, writer, editor, publisher and academic
 Reuben Chirambo (d. 2011), scholar of African literature
 Robert Chiwamba, poet
 Tobias Dossi, author of a novel (1958) and humorous short stories (1965) in Chichewa.
 Aloysius Dziko, author of a novel in Chichewa (1965).
 Walije Gondwe (b. 1936), Malawi's first female novelist
 John Gwengwe, author of novels in Chichewa (1965, 1968).
 Aubrey Kachingwe (b. 1926), novelist and short story writer
 Lawrence Kadzitche, short story writer
 Samson Kambalu (b. 1975), artist and autobiographer
 William Kamkwamba (b. 1987), inventor and author
 Gertrude Webster Kamkwatira (1966–2006), playwright
 Whyghtone Kamthunzi (1956–2000), novelist in Chichewa
 Legson Kayira (1942–2012), novelist and autobiographer
 Stanley Onjezani Kenani (b. 1976), writer and poet
 Ken Lipenga (b. 1954), politician, journalist and writer
 John Lwanda (b. 1949), biographer, poet, doctor, publisher
 Qabaniso Malewezi (b. 1979), spoken-word poet
 Benedicto Wokomaatani Malunga (b. 1962), poet and broadcaster
 Jack Mapanje (b. 1944), writer and poet
 Emily Mkamanga (b. 1949), novelist and social commentator
 Felix Mnthali (b. 1933), poet, novelist and playwright
 Francis Moto (b. 1952), writer, academic, and diplomat
 Sam Mpasu (b. 1945), novelist and politician; author of prison memoirs
 Edison Mpina (1946–2001), poet
 Ndongolera Mwangupili (b. 1977), poet and short story writer
 George Mwase (c.1885–1962), author of a historical account of the 1915 rebellion, published 1967 (2nd ed. 1970).
 Anthony Nazombe (1955–2004), poet and academic
 Innocent Masina Nkhonyo (b. 1987), short story writer and poet
 Jolly Max Ntaba (1946–1993), novelist in Chichewa and English
 Samuel Josia Ntara or Nthara (1905–1979), novelist and historian
 D.D. Phiri (Desmond Dudwa Phiri), economist, historian and playwright
Peter Foley (b. 1988),author, editor,journalist and language teacher
Bonwell Kadyankena Rodgers (b. 1991), author and editor
 David Rubadiri (1930–2018), diplomat, academic and poet
 Tendai M Shaba (b. 1989), author, writer and poet 
 Paul Tiyambe Zeleza (b. 1955), historian, critic and writer
 Barnaba Zingani (b. 1958), novelist in Chichewa and English, teacher.
 Willie Zingani (b. 1954), novelist in English and Chichewa, journalist, poet, playwright

See also
 Media of Malawi
 List of African writers by country

References 

Malawian
Writers
Malawian